Louis Gallouédec (17 February 1864 – 23 January 1937) was a French geographer.

1864 births
1937 deaths
École Normale Supérieure alumni
French geographers
People from Morlaix